Phileas can refer to:

 Phileas (public transport), in the Netherlands
 Phileas Fogg, the lead figure from Around the World in Eighty Days
 Phileas Fogg snacks, in the United Kingdom
 Phileas of Thmuis, early Egyptian martyr

See also
 Pelleas and Pelleas and Melisande (disambiguation)